State Route 313 (SR 313) is a north-south state highway located entirely in Worth County in the southwestern part of the U.S. state of Georgia.

Route description

SR 313 begins at an intersection with US 82/SR 520 in Sylvester. The route heads north-northwest through rural parts of the county, and along the way, passes through the unincorporated community of Isabella. After Isballa, SR 313 continues heading north-northwest until it meets SR 32 in the unincorporated community of Doles. The highway continues north-northwest, and curves to the northwest just before meeting its northern terminus, an intersection with SR 300 in Warwick.

History

Major intersections

See also

References

External links

313
Transportation in Worth County, Georgia